John Marshall Stone (April 30, 1830March 26, 1900) was an American politician from Mississippi. A Democrat, he served longer as governor of that state than anyone else, from 1876 to 1882 and again from 1890 to 1896. He approved a new constitution in 1890 passed by the Democratic-dominated state legislature that disfranchised most African Americans, excluding them from the political system. They were kept out for nearly 70 years.

Early life 
Born in Milan, Tennessee, Stone was the son of Asher and Judith Stone, natives of Virginia who were part of the migration to the west. He did not attend college since his family was fairly poor, but he studied a great deal and eventually taught school. He lived in Jacks Creek, Tennessee before moving to Tishomingo County, Mississippi in 1855. Stone became a station agent at Iuka when the Memphis and Charleston Railroad opened.

American Civil War 
With the outbreak of the American Civil War in 1861, Stone enlisted in the Confederate States Army that April. He commanded Company K of the Second Mississippi Infantry and saw action in Virginia. In 1862, Stone, a colonel, was placed in command of another regiment due to a reorganization. Stone was highly commended by his division commander Maj. Gen. Henry Heth, and in 1864, he frequently commanded the brigade. In January 1865, he recruited in Mississippi and commanded local troops countering Stoneman's 1865 Raid. He and his men were captured in North Carolina and imprisoned in Camp Chase, Ohio; later transferred to Johnson's Island, Ohio.

Political career 

At the end of the war, Stone returned to Tishomingo County. He was elected mayor and treasurer. In 1869, he won a race to become state senator, winning re-election in 1873. State elections were marked by fraud and violence; the Red Shirts, a paramilitary group, worked to disrupt and suppress black voting and turned Republicans out of office. After Governor Adelbert Ames resigned in 1876, Stone, who was president pro tempore of the Mississippi State Senate at that time, served as the acting governor.

In the 1877 election, Stone won the governor's office as a Democrat. In 1881 he was defeated for re-election by Robert Lowry. Stone became governor again after winning the 1889 election. The gubernatorial term was extended through 1896 by the new Mississippi Constitution of 1890. Determined to keep control and maintain white supremacy, the Democratic-dominated legislature effectively disfranchised most blacks in the state by adding a requirement to the constitution for voter registration for payment of poll taxes. Two years later, they passed laws requiring literacy tests (administered by white officials in a discriminatory way) and grandfather clauses (the latter benefited white citizens). These requirements, with additions in the legislation of 1892, resulted in a 90% reduction in the number of blacks who voted in Mississippi. In every county a handful of prominent black ministers and local leaders were allowed to vote. African Americans were essentially excluded from the political system for 70 years until after the passage of federal civil rights legislation in the mid-1960s. When this constitution and laws survived an appeal to the US Supreme Court, other southern states quickly adopted the "Mississippi Plan" and passed disfranchising constitutions through 1908. Voter rolls dropped dramatically in other southern states as well, and white Democrats dominated politics.

Later life 
Following his term as governor, in 1899, Stone accepted a position as the 2nd President of Mississippi A&M (now Mississippi State University) in Starkville. Stone died in Holly Springs, Mississippi, in 1900, at 69. He is buried at Oak Grove Cemetery in Iuka, Mississippi.

Personal life 
After the war, Stone married Mary G. Coman in 1872. The couple had two children who died young. They adopted three children of John's brother and raised them as their own.

Legacy and honors 
 In 1916 Stone County, Mississippi, was named in his honor posthumously.
 Stone Boulevard at Mississippi State is named for him. 
 The John M. Stone Cotton Mill in Starkville was formerly named in his honor. However, it was renamed the E.E. Cooley Building after being purchased by Mississippi State University (MSU) in 1965. This building was used for many years to house the university's physical plant. The building reopened in 2015 as an event center.

See also 
 List of governors of Mississippi
 List of lieutenant governors of Mississippi
 List of members of the United Confederate Veterans
 List of presidents of Mississippi State University

References

External links 

 Mississippi State University General Information
 Gallery of the Presidents
 John Marshall Stone entry at the National Governors Association
 John Marshall Stone entry at The Political Graveyard
 

|-

1830 births
1900 deaths
19th-century American politicians
American Civil War prisoners of war
Confederate States Army officers
Democratic Party governors of Mississippi
Lieutenant Governors of Mississippi
Democratic Party Mississippi state senators
People from Milan, Tennessee
People of Mississippi in the American Civil War
Presidents of Mississippi State University
Stone County, Mississippi